Brodie Matthew Brazil (born April 3, 1981) is an American television broadcaster who has won 13 Regional Emmy Awards and nominated for 32.

Professional life
Even before graduating with a degree in broadcasting from San Jose State University, Brazil got his start in broadcasting by interning for KICU-TV's Regional Emmy Award winning show High School Sports Focus. He became a co-host in 2003. In February 2009 Brazil joined the team at NBC Sports Bay Area. He is currently the Pre & Post Game host and rinkside reporter for San Jose Sharks telecasts, hosts Oakland A's Pre & Post Game, hosts Sports Net Reports, he hosts his own podcast “Brodie Brazil Connected” which mainly features commentary on the San Jose Sharks and the Oakland A’s in their respective seasons, Brodie also does work for Shark Byte, a magazine-style show centering on the San Jose Sharks that originated on NBC Sports Bay Area, is an anchor on SportsNet Central and is the San Jose Sharks insider for 95.7 The Game, an FM sports radio station.  Brazil has also appeared in episodes of Sharks Late Night Confidential, covered the San Francisco Giants and 49ers, the Golden State Warriors, Oakland Raiders, San Jose Earthquakes, The University of California, Stanford University, San Jose State University, NASCAR and a variety of local sports stories.  Brodie is also an aviation expert.

Family
Brazil is the older brother of Darren Brazil, a Bay Area Regional Emmy Award winning editor, producer and videographer.

Awards
Since 2003, Brazil has been nominated 32 times and has won 13 Regional Emmy Awards for his work with KTVU/KICU-TV and NBC Sports Bay Area.

Extracurricular
Brazil is an FAA Instrument-rated commercial pilot and Certified Flight Instructor.

References

External links 
 
 Brodie Brazil on CSN Bay Area
 Brodie Brazil on Vimeo
 Brodie Brazil on Twitter

1981 births
Living people
American television reporters and correspondents
San Jose Sharks announcers
National Hockey League broadcasters
People from Castro Valley, California
Commercial aviators